CESNUR  (Centro Studi sulle Nuove Religioni, "Center for Studies on New Religions"), is a non-profit organization based in Turin, Italy that studies new religious movements and opposes the anti-cult movement. It was established in 1988 by Massimo Introvigne, Jean-François Mayer and Ernesto Zucchini. Its first president was Giuseppe Casale. Later, Luigi Berzano became CESNUR's president.

CESNUR has been described as "the highest profile lobbying and information group for controversial religions".
CESNUR's scholars have defended such diverse groups as the Unification Church, the Church of Scientology, the Order of the Solar Temple (responsible for 74 deaths in mass murder-suicide), and Shincheonji Church of Jesus, accused of having aided the spread of the COVID-19 pandemic in South Korea.

CESNUR describes itself as an independent scholarly organization, but the organization has met with criticism for alleged personal and financial ties to the groups it studies; anthropologist Richard Singelenberg questioned in 1997 whether CESNUR is "too friendly and does not make enough critical comments about new religious movements and sects". According to sociologist Stephen A. Kent, "many scholars, however, see both CESNUR and INFORM in a favourable light, and they share its criticism of the  'sect-monitors' in France, Germany, and Belgium."

CESNUR publishes The Journal of CESNUR, a journal on new religious movements,  and Bitter Winter, an online magazine about religious issues in China. CESNUR sponsors annual conferences; its 2019 conference was attended by over 200 individuals.

History

CESNUR was founded in 1988 at a seminar organized by Massimo Introvigne, Jean-François Mayer, and Ernesto Zucchini in Italy. Introvigne is an Italian intellectual-property attorney and sociology lecturer who also serves as the group's director. A member of the Catholic conservative organization Alleanza Cattolica since 1972, Introvigne served as that group's vice president until 2016. Mayer is a Swiss historian specialized in new religious movements. He was for a time a lecturer at University of Fribourg and in 2012, he was appointed by the Canton of Fribourg to prepare a report on the situation of religious communities there. Zucchini is a Catholic priest, who became in 2009 professor of theology in the Theological School of the Diocese of Massa Carrara-Pontremoli in Italy and published and lectured about the Italian mystic Maria Valtorta and about the Jehovah's Witnesses.

Giuseppe Casale, a Catholic historian and Archbishop of the Archdiocese of Foggia-Bovino, was appointed as the first president of CESNUR. Reviewing the proceedings of one of the first CESNUR conferences, French sociologist Jean Séguy wrote in 1988 that most participants were Catholic and presented the traditional Catholic view of phenomena such as Spiritualism and the New Age.

Other members of CESNUR's board include Luigi Berzano, Gianni Ambrosio, Reender Kranenborg, Eileen Barker and J. Gordon Melton. Berzano, who later became CESNUR's president, is a professor of sociology at the University of Turin. Ambrosio is an Italian sociologist who became in 2007 bishop of the Catholic Diocese of Piacenza-Bobbio.  Kranenborg is a Dutch Reformed theologian. Barker is a sociologist who wrote The Making of a Moonie: Choice or Brainwashing? (1984) and formed the Information Network Focus on Religious Movements (INFORM) in 1988. Melton is Distinguished Professor of American Religious History at Baylor University in Waco, Texas.

In 1995 the French Parliamentary Commission on Cults in France, after the events of the Order of the Solar Temple, published a critical report on cults. This was followed by similar reports by other governments. CESNUR claimed these texts relied excessively on information supplied by the anti-cult movement and criticized them publicly, particularly through a book called Pour en finir avec les sectes. Canadian scholar Susan Jean Palmer wrote that the title, translated as "To Put an End to the Sects", had a double meaning and was "deliberately misleading", as, rather than to sects of cults, the authors wanted to put an end to governmental criticism of them. French sociologists Jean-Louis Schlegel and Nathalie Luca reviewed the book critically, noting that while the authors were right in criticizing some mistakes of the Parliamentary report, CESNUR had moved with the volume from a scholarly to a militant advocacy position and to a one-sided defense of cults. According to Palmer, the book upset the French authorities so much so that one of its co-authors, French historian Antoine Faivre, was placed by the police under temporary arrest (garde à vue), accused of having disclosed confidential details about the persons interviewed by the Parliamentary Commission, although he was detained for a few hours only and a judge later dropped the charges.

In 2001 and 2006 CESNUR published two editions of its encyclopedia of religions in Italy.

Organization 
According to its official website, CESNUR "is a network of independent but related organizations of scholars in various countries, devoted to promote scholarly research in the field of new religious consciousness, to spread reliable and responsible information, and to expose the very real problems associated with some movements, while at the same time defending everywhere the principles of religious liberty."

While established by a group composed mostly of Catholic scholars, CESNUR is not affiliated with any religious group or denomination and has from the outset included scholars of various religious persuasions.

CESNUR is critical of concepts like mind control, thought reform and brainwashing, asserting that they lack scientific and scholarly support and are mainly based on anecdotal evidence.

In a 2018 history of the academic study of new religious movements, American scholar W. Michael Ashcraft described CESNUR as "the largest outlet currently supporting research on NRMs."

In 2018, The Korea Times described CESNUR as "the largest international association of scholars specializing in the study of new religious movements."

Funding sources
The Italian authorities recognized CESNUR as a public non-profit organization in 1996 and were contributors to CESNUR projects. Other sources of income include book royalties and member contributions.

Activities and publications
Since 2017, CESNUR has published The Journal of CESNUR. CESNUR sponsors yearly conferences in the field of new religions.   The 2019 conference at the University of Turin included over 200 attendees.

Introvigne has spoken before the Commission on Security and Cooperation in Europe and the Organization for Security and Co-operation in Europe. He testified on behalf of Scientologists in a criminal trial in Lyon. In 1995, Introvigne argued that Order of the Solar Temple members who died by mass suicide had acted on their own initiative as opposed to being victims of the leader's manipulations. In 1997, Melton appeared as an expert witness on behalf of the Singapore branch of the International Churches of Christ, arguing that the group was not a "cult". The testimony garnered attention for Melton's admission on cross-examination that he had publicly made similar claims about Peoples Temple, responsible for 918 deaths in Jonestown, Guyana.

Bitter Winter
Bitter Winter was launched in May 2018 as an online magazine which covers religious freedom and human rights in China. According to the magazine it is supported by volunteer contributions and is published daily in five languages.

Some of the magazine's correspondents were arrested in late 2018 by the authorities for their work documenting and publicizing antireligious campaigns in China. The United States Department of State in the chapter on China of its 2019 Human Rights Report noted that, among 45 Bitter Winter contributors the magazine reported had been arrested in 2018, in 2019, 4 of the 22 detained in Xinjiang were released, and among the 23 detained in Henan, Fujian, Zhejiang and Shanxi, "several had been released after indoctrination training," while "online media reported that police tortured" those arrested in Fujian.

The same United States Department of State quoted repeatedly Bitter Winter as "an online magazine on religious liberty and human rights in China" in the China section of its 2018 International Religious Freedom Report. The American evangelical magazine World called Bitter Winter "a thorn in the side" of the Chinese Communist Party, and reported that in a secret document "the Chinese government has called Bitter Winter an 'overseas hostile website' [境外敌对网站] and instructed its intelligence agency, the Ministry of State Security, to investigate the group."

Criticism
In a 1996 piece in Charlie Hebdo, French essayist Renaud Marhic accused CESNUR of being "a scientific screen used to relay [Introvigne's] theses to the complacent media".

Scholars Stephen A. Kent and Raffaella Di Marzio have argued that CESNUR's representation of the brainwashing controversy is one-sided, polemical and sometimes without scholarly value. Kent further observed: "Many German and French officials working on issues related to religious 'sects' and human rights do not see CESNUR and Introvigne as neutral parties in the ongoing debates... Consequently, other people and organizations have damaged their reputations (rightly or wrongly) among these officials by associating too closely with CESNUR".

In 2001, French journalist Serge Garde accused CESNUR of "systematic interventions in favor of sects brought to justice", naming Jehovah's Witnesses, Scientology, Order of the Solar Temple, the Unification Church and Aum Shinrikyo and opined that "all the sects know they can count on CESNUR".

CESNUR again met with controversy when one of the scheduled speakers at the 1997 CESNUR conference, who was to present scholarship on the religious group New Acropolis, was discovered to be a member of the very group she purported to study. Michiel Louter writing for Dutch magazine De Groene Amsterdammer opined: "It is difficult to believe that CESNUR-director Introvigne was not up-to-date on her membership in the group". The participation of the New Acropolis speaker to the conference was canceled after the connection was publicly reported by Dutch publication Trouw.

Aum Shinrikyo sarin gas attack of 1995
In the aftermath of the 1995 sarin gas attack on the Tokyo subway, CESNUR board member J. Gordon Melton and occasional CESNUR conference speaker James R. Lewis flew to Japan at the expense of Aum Shinrikyo; they then held press conferences in Japan stating their belief that the group did not have the ability to produce sarin and was being scapegoated. Melton later revised his judgment. A paper mentioning the investigation was presented at the 1995 CESNUR conference.

Though CESNUR director Massimo Introvigne defended what he termed the "much maligned" investigation, others in the field felt that the scholars' defense of Aum Shinrikyo led to a crisis of confidence in religious scholarship when Aum's culpability was proven. Scholar Ian Reader disputed Introvigne's defense, writing "the case in hand certainly shows that some scholars are capable of saying what those who call on them want them to say, even when the evidence points the other way".

Eastern Lightning and the murder of Wu Shuoyan
In 2018, Bitter Winter was criticized for its sympathetic coverage of Eastern Lightning, a group regarded as a cult in China. Introvigne discussed in Bitter Winter the 2014 murder of Wu Shuoyan, attributed by Chinese authorities to Eastern Lightning. He supported the position first presented in articles of the Chinese daily The Beijing News in 2014, then advocated in 2015 by Australian scholar Emily Dunn,
that the perpetrators were not members of Eastern Lightning at the time of the murder. This position was described in 2020 by reporter Donald Kirk as common among scholars. However, while Dunn wrote that the two leaders of the group that committed the murder "started out as members of Eastern Lightning (in 1998 and 2007 respectively), [but] they had outgrown it" and were no longer part of the sect in 2014. Introvigne, based on a different interpretation of the same Chinese sources quoted by Dunn, argued, both in Bitter Winter and in his 2020 book Inside The Church of Almighty God, that they had never been members of Eastern Lightning.

Mainstream reporting held that in 2002, members of Eastern Lightning kidnapped 34 members of the China Gospel Fellowship and held them captive for two months, with the aim of coercing them to join Eastern Lighting. Introvigne, however, suggested in 2018 that China Gospel Fellowship invented the story of the kidnapping as justification for the fact that many of its members, including national leaders, had converted to Eastern Lightning. In his 2020 book, he adopted a more nuanced position, suggesting that China Gospel Fellowship members described as "kidnapping" what was in fact "deception," as they were invited, and went voluntarily, to training sessions without being told that they were organized by Eastern Lightning.

In 2019, CESNUR's Bitter Winter co-hosted in Seoul with Human Rights Without Frontiers a conference supporting the right of asylum of Eastern Lightning and Uyghur refugees from China living in South Korea. Members of Eastern Lightning and the Uyghur diaspora also spoke in the conference.

Shincheonji and spread of COVID-19
On November 29, 2019, CESNUR co-organized a seminar in Seoul claiming that thousands of members of Shincheonji, a group many in South Korea regard as a cult, had been subject to forcible deprogramming. Introvigne was among the speakers.

Regarding the  Shincheonji organization's association with a coronavirus outbreak in 2020, CESNUR and Human Rights Without Frontiers released a joint white paper claiming that, although Shincheonji made "mistakes" in its management of the crisis, the organization had also been discriminated against because of its unpopular status.

References

Bibliography

External links
 CESNUR official site

 
Research institutes in Italy